Crypto-Protestantism is a historical phenomenon that first arose on the territory of the Habsburg Empire but also elsewhere in Europe and Latin America, at a time when Catholic rulers tried, after the Protestant Reformation, to reestablish Catholicism in parts of the Empire that had become Protestant after the Reformation. The Protestants in these areas strove to retain their own confession inwardly while they outwardly pretended to accept Catholicism. With the Patent of Toleration in the Habsburg Empire in 1781, Protestantism was again permitted, and from that time on most Protestants could live their faith openly once more.

See also
Nicodemite
Crypto-Papism
Crypto-Christianity
Crypto-Calvinism
Hundskirke stone
Cafeteria Catholicism
Zoë movement
Cum ex apostolatus officio,
Molinism
Jansenism (sometimes labeled as Crypto-Calvinism)

Salzburg Protestants
Transylvanian Landler
Zillertal Valley expulsion

References

Protestant Reformation
Counter-Reformation